Nandiala is a department or commune of Boulkiemdé Province in central Burkina Faso. As of 2005 it has a population of 33,530. Its capital lies at the town of Nandiala.

Towns and villages
NandialaBaoguinGouimGourongoGourcyItaoréKaoncéRihaloSilmissinSoméTibrela

References

Departments of Burkina Faso
Boulkiemdé Province